Booneville  is a city in the U.S. state of Mississippi and is the county seat of Prentiss County. It is located in the hilly North Mississippi region, and ecologically is part of the Southeastern Plains region.

The city of Booneville is nicknamed "the City of Hospitality," in reference to the town's southern hospitality. The city flag, welcome sign, and city website bear the image of a magnolia blossom, a symbol of hospitality as well as the state flower of Mississippi. Booneville was incorporated in 1861 and named after R.H. Boone, a relative of Daniel Boone. The population was 8,743 at the 2010 census. It is one of 21 certified Mississippi retirement cities.

Booneville is home to Northeast Mississippi Community College, the tenth-largest community college by enrollment in the state.

History
The land of Booneville was bought by B.B. Boone, G.W. Williams, and W.P. Curlee from the Chickasaw tribesman Le-Ho-Yea. The community was named for settler Colonel Reuben Holman Boone, a relative of Daniel Boone, the early American pioneer. The city was initially planned in 1848 as part of the construction on the Mobile and Ohio Railroad. While the settlement grew rapidly in its early years, the American Civil War began just as the city incorporated in 1861 and slowed the city's progress.

Civil War

The Mobile and Ohio Railroad that ran through Booneville was completed shortly before the Civil War began. It was converted to military use and became a critical military target. 184 miles of the line from Union City, Tennessee to Okolona, Mississippi would be totally destroyed by 1866, causing severe financial strain for the railroad even after it was eventually rebuilt.

On May 30, 1862, Col. Washington Lafayette Elliott of the 2nd Iowa Cavalry Regiment led a Union brigade to Booneville, where they destroyed the local depot and a large train loaded with munitions and captured 2,000 sick and wounded Confederates.

On June 28, 1862, Col. Philip Sheridan of the Union fortified a position in Booneville after hearing that the Confederates intended to move from Tupelo to Corinth in an attempt to recapture the rail junction there. Brig. Gen. James R. Chalmers of the Confederacy led 4,700 troops in an assault that pushed the Union troops to withdraw to a backup position  closer to the town. The bulk of the Union force stayed on the defensive while Sheridan sent the 2nd Michigan Cavalry under Capt. Russell Alexander and the 2nd Iowa Cavalry under Lt. Col. Edward Hatch to attack the Confederate rear and left flank. It is estimated 65 of Chalmers' men were killed; Federal casualties were one dead, 24 wounded, and 16 missing.

Korean War
On December 22, 1950, an explosion and fire at the Booneville Armory killed seven members of Company B, 198th Tank Battalion, a Mississippi Army National Guard unit. Their deaths are considered the first domestic casualties of the Korean War.

Geography
The city is concentrated along Mississippi Highway 145 between its intersections with Mississippi Highway 30 to the south and Mississippi Highway 4 to the north. U.S. Route 45 passes through western Booneville, connecting the city with Corinth and Tupelo.

Climate
Climate is characterized by relatively high temperatures and evenly distributed precipitation throughout the year.  The Köppen Climate Classification subtype for this climate is "Cfa" (Humid Subtropical Climate).

Demographics

2020 census

As of the 2020 United States Census, there were 9,126 people, 2,877 households, and 1,710 families residing in the city.

2000 census
As of the census of 2000, there were 8,625 people, 3,302 households, and 2,205 families residing in the city. The population density was 335.8 people per square mile (129.6/km2). There were 3,625 housing units at an average density of 141.1 per square mile (54.5/km2). The racial makeup of the city was 79.88% White, 18.49% African American, 0.30% Native American, 0.31% Asian, 0.15% from other races, and 0.86% from two or more races. Hispanic or Latino of any race were 0.71% of the population.

There were 3,302 households, out of which 30.4% had children under the age of 18 living with them, 47.8% were married couples living together, 14.7% had a female householder with no husband present, and 33.2% were non-families. 30.7% of all households were made up of individuals, and 16.1% had someone living alone who was 65 years of age or older. The average household size was 2.35 and the average family size was 2.93.

In the city, the population was spread out, with 22.2% under the age of 18, 16.6% from 18 to 24, 23.8% from 25 to 44, 20.1% from 45 to 64, and 17.3% who were 65 years of age or older. The median age was 35 years. For every 100 females, there were 87.6 males. For every 100 females age 18 and over, there were 81.6 males.

The median income for a household in the city was $28,361, and the median income for a family was $38,918. Males had a median income of $29,667 versus $19,821 for females. The per capita income for the city was $15,128. About 11.2% of families and 15.2% of the population were below the poverty line, including 16.2% of those under age 18 and 17.6% of those age 65 or over.

As of the 2010 census, the population was 8,743.

Education 
 The City of Booneville is served by two public school districts - Booneville and Prentiss County.
 Booneville is home to Northeast Mississippi Community College, which has an annual enrollment in excess of 6,000 students.  The community college serves five counties: Prentiss, Tippah, Alcorn, Union, and Tishomingo.

Media

Newspapers
 Banner Independent
 Prentiss County Progress

Television stations
 WMAE-TV Channel 12 TV
 W34DV-D Channel 34 TV

Radio stations
 WBIP AM 1400 Hometown Radio

Infrastructure

Transportation

Notable people
 Cecil Bolton,  Major League Baseball first baseman for the Cleveland Indians 
 George E. Allen, American political figure and head football coach for 1 game at Cumberland University
 Harold Bishop, Jr., professional football player
 Travis Childers, former congressman
 Jamie Davis, Southern rock musician
 Gene Kelton, singer-songwriter, blues musician, and band leader of Mean Gene Kelton & The Die Hards
 Hayden Thompson, is an American singer, songwriter, and rockabilly musician He is a member of the Rockabilly Hall of Fame
 Asya Branch,  Miss Mississippi 2018, Miss Mississippi USA  2020, and Miss USA 2020
 Leland Scott Pettigo, former foreman at Memphis Light, Gas and Water

See also
List of census-designated places in Mississippi by population

References

External links

 Chamber of Commerce - Booneville

Cities in Mississippi
Cities in Prentiss County, Mississippi
County seats in Mississippi